This was a new event in 2013.

Ksenia Pervak won the tournament, defeating Eva Birnerová in the final, 6–4, 7–6(7–4).

Seeds

Main draw

Finals

Top half

Bottom half

References 
 Main draw

Kemer Cup - Singles